Antonina Nastoburko (née Pobyubko; born 21 January 1959) is a Ukrainian female former Soviet track and field sprinter who competed in the 100 metres. She was a member of the silver medal-winning Soviet 4 × 100 metres relay team at the 1985 IAAF World Cup, leading off the race for teammates Natalya Bochina, Marina Zhirova and Elvira Barbashina. She ran individually and in the relay at the 1986 European Athletics Championships, making it to the semi-finals of the women's 100 m and taking a bronze medal in the relay alongside Bochina, Zhirova, and Olga Zolotaryova. She also competed at the 1986 Goodwill Games in Moscow that year, taking sixth place in the women's 100 m.

Her lifetime best for the women's 100 m was 11.27 seconds, set in Leningrad on 2 August 1985. She helped set the all-time Soviet record for the 4 × 100 metres relay, running the first leg in a team with Natalya Pomoshchnikova-Voronova, Marina Zhirova and Elvira Barbashina.

International competitions

See also
List of European Athletics Championships medalists (women)

References

1959 births
Living people
Soviet female sprinters
Ukrainian female sprinters
European Athletics Championships medalists
Competitors at the 1986 Goodwill Games